Larry Gordon (July 8, 1954 – June 25, 1983) was an American football linebacker who played seven seasons in the National Football League (NFL) for the Miami Dolphins. A member of the Dolphins' Silver Anniversary team, he was in the starting lineup from his rookie season until his death. 

During his college football career at Arizona State he played alongside future All-American and Dallas Cowboys linebacker, Bob Breunig. Together, they are viewed as the best linebacker tandem to ever play the position at ASU.

In 1976 Gordon won the Tommy Fitzgerald Award as the Dolphins' outstanding rookie in training camp. He would be named the team's outstanding LB twice in his career. In 1978 Gordon intercepted 3 passes in a 23–6 rout of the Raiders that clinched a wildcard berth for the Dolphins. In 1979 he set a team playoff record for the most fumble recoveries in a game (2 vs Pittsburgh).

Gordon collapsed while jogging in the desert outside Phoenix, Arizona on June 25, 1983, and died about an hour later at a Phoenix hospital. His death was attributed to heart disease.

References

1954 births
1983 deaths
American football linebackers
Miami Dolphins players
Arizona State Sun Devils football players
Sportspeople from Monroe, Louisiana
People from Miramar, Florida
Players of American football from Louisiana